In Eastern Christianity, a passion bearer is one of the various customary titles for saints used in commemoration at divine services when honouring their feast on the Church Calendar; it is not generally used by Catholics of the Roman Rite, but it is used within the Eastern Catholic Churches.

Definition
The term can be defined as a person who faces his or her death in a Christ-like manner. Unlike martyrs, passion bearers are not explicitly killed for their faith, though they hold to that faith with piety and true love of God. Thus, although all martyrs are passion bearers, not all passion bearers are martyrs.

In Eastern Orthodoxy
Notable passion bearers include the brothers Boris and Gleb, Alexander Schmorell (executed for being a member of the White Rose student movement which wrote and distributed Samizdat that denounced Nazism), Mother Maria Skobtsova, and the entire Imperial Family of Russia, executed by the Bolsheviks on July 17, 1918.

Byzantine Catholicism
Following the collapse of the Soviet Union, the surviving Russian Catholics, many of whom were directly connected to the Greek Catholic community of Dominican Sisters founded in August 1917 by Mother Catherine Abrikosova, began to appear in the open. At the same time, the martyrology of the Russian Greek Catholic Church began to be investigated.

In 2001, Exarch Leonid Feodorov was beatified during a Byzantine Rite Divine Liturgy offered in Lviv by Pope John Paul II.

In 2003, a positio towards the Causes for Beatification of six others of those whom Fr. Christopher Zugger has termed, "The Passion bearers of the Russian Catholic Exarchate": Fabijan Abrantovich, Anna Abrikosova, Igor Akulov, Potapy Emelianov, Halina Jętkiewicz, and Andrzej Cikoto; was submitted to the Holy See's Congregation for the Causes of Saints by the Bishops of the Catholic Church in Russia.

Passion bearers

Unified Church
 Boris
 Gleb
 Doulas
 George the Hungarian

20th century Orthodox Passion bearers
 Eugene Botkin
 Romanov Imperial Family
 Nicholas II
 Empress Alexandra Feodorovna
 Grand Duchess Olga Nikolaevna
 Grand Duchess Tatiana Nikolaevna
 Grand Duchess Maria Nikolaevna
 Grand Duchess Anastasia Nikolaevna
 Tsarevich Alexei
 Alexander Schmorell

References

 
Types of saints
Groups of Eastern Orthodox saints